Carson Lee Whisenhunt (born October 20, 2000) is an American professional baseball pitcher in the San Francisco Giants organization.

Amateur career 
Whisenhunt attended Davie County High School in Mocksville, North Carolina where he played on their baseball team. He earned all-state honors as a senior in 2019. He went unselected in the 2019 Major League Baseball draft and enrolled at East Carolina University to play college baseball.

Whisenhunt made eight relief appearances as a freshman at East Carolina in 2020 before the season was cancelled due to the COVID-19 pandemic. That summer, he played in the Coastal Plain League for the High Point-Thomasville HiToms. For the 2021 season, he started 13 games and went 6–2 with a 3.77 ERA, 79 strikeouts, and 22 walks over 62 innings. After the season's end, he played for the USA Baseball Collegiate National Team. Whisenhunt opened the 2022 season as a top prospect for the upcoming draft. However, he was served a suspension by head coach Cliff Godwin to open the season. It was later announced that Whisenhunt had failed a performance-enhancing drug test, and was ruled ineligible for the whole season. Whisenhunt stated that the drug in question was a supplement "purchased at a nationwide nutrition store which resulted in a positive test." Following the end of the 2022 NCAA season, he played collegiate summer baseball in the Cape Cod Baseball League with the Chatham Anglers. Over four starts, he went 1-3 with a 7.88 ERA, 21 strikeouts, and six walks over 16 innings.

Professional career
The San Francisco Giants selected Whisenhunt in the second round with the 65th overall pick of the 2022 Major League Baseball draft. He signed with the team for $1.87 million.

Whisenhunt made his professional debut with the Rookie-level Arizona Complex League Giants and was later promoted to the San Jose Giants of the Single-A California League. Over  innings between the two teams, he struck out 14 batters, walked one, and gave up no runs. He was selected to play in the Arizona Fall League for the Scottsdale Scorpions after the season.

References

External links
East Carolina Pirates bio

2000 births
Living people
Baseball players from North Carolina
Baseball pitchers
East Carolina Pirates baseball players
Chatham Anglers players
Arizona Complex League Giants players